Enida taiwanensis is a species of sea snail, a marine gastropod mollusk in the family Trochidae, the top snails.

Description

Distribution
This marine species occurs off Southeast Asia and Taiwan.

References

External links

taiwanensis
Gastropods described in 2002